Hsu Yu-hsiou and Oleksii Krutykh were the defending champions but chose not to defend their title.

Filip Bergevi and Petros Tsitsipas won the title after defeating Sarp Ağabigün and Ergi Kırkın 6–2, 6–4 in the final.

Seeds

Draw

References

External links
 Main draw

Antalya Challenger - Doubles